Theiviya Selvarajoo (born 20 June 1994) is a Malaysian tennis player.

Selvarajoo made her WTA tour debut at the 2013 Malaysian Open, having received a wildcard with Yus Syazlin Nabila Binti Yusri into the doubles tournament. At the 2015 Malaysian Open, Selvarajoo received a wildcard into the doubles main draw with Jawairiah Noordin.

Playing for Malaysia at the Fed Cup, Selvarajoo has a win–loss record of 4–4.

ITF finals: 2 (1–1)

Doubles: 2 (1–1)

References

External links 
 
 
 

1994 births
Living people
Malaysian female tennis players
Malaysian people of Indian descent
Southeast Asian Games bronze medalists for Malaysia
Southeast Asian Games medalists in tennis
Competitors at the 2015 Southeast Asian Games